Vivus! is a live album released by American death metal band Death through Relapse Records. It contains two previously released live albums: Live in L.A. (Death & Raw) and Live in Eindhoven. Both shows contained on Vivus! were recorded in 1998. Disc one features the band at Whisky a Go Go in Los Angeles, while disc two is a recording of the band on the festival stage at Dynamo Open Air. The band's manager, Eric Greif, has stated that the inspiration for the set and its title was the Kiss album Alive!.

Track listing

Personnel
 Chuck Schuldiner – vocals, guitar
 Richard Christy – drums
 Scott Clendenin – bass
 Shannon Hamm – guitar

References

Death (metal band) albums
2012 live albums
Live albums published posthumously
Relapse Records live albums